Detlef Laugwitz (1932–2000) was a German mathematician and historian, who worked in differential geometry, history of mathematics, functional analysis, and non-standard analysis.

Biography
He was born on 11 May 1932 in Breslau, Germany. Starting in 1949, he studied mathematics, physics, and philosophy at the Georg-August-University at Göttingen, where he received his doctorate in 1954. Until 1956 he worked in the Mathematical Research Institute of Oberwolfach. In 1958 he became a lecturer at the Technical University of Munich, where he obtained his Habilitation. In 1958 he moved to the Technical University of Darmstadt, where in 1962 he became a professor, and remained until his retirement. From 1976 to 1984 he was a visiting professor at Caltech.

Work
Laugwitz worked in differential geometry of infinite dimensional vector spaces (his dissertation) and in Finsler geometry. In 1958 he and Curt Schmieden developed their own approach to infinitesimals through field extensions, independently of Abraham Robinson. They described this as "infinitesimal mathematics" and leading back to the historical roots in Leibniz. In 1996 he published the standard biography of Bernhard Riemann.

Notes

Publications

.

20th-century German mathematicians
German historians of mathematics
Differential geometers
Technical University of Munich alumni
Academic staff of the Technical University of Munich
1932 births
2000 deaths
20th-century German historians
Academic staff of Technische Universität Darmstadt